Kochoghot or Yayiji is a village de facto in the Martakert Province of the breakaway Republic of Artsakh, de jure in the Kalbajar District of Azerbaijan, in the disputed region of Nagorno-Karabakh. The village has an ethnic Armenian-majority population, and also had an Armenian majority in 1989.

History 
During the Soviet period, the village was a part of the Mardakert District of the Nagorno-Karabakh Autonomous Oblast.

Historical heritage sites 
Historical heritage sites in and around the village include tombs from the 2nd–1st millennia BCE, a 13th-century village and cemetery, and the 17th-century church of Surb Astvatsatsin.

Economy and culture 
The population is mainly engaged in agriculture, animal husbandry, and mining. As of 2015, the village has a municipal building, a secondary school, 11 shops, and a medical centre.

Demographics 
The village had 534 inhabitants in 2005, and 547 inhabitants in 2015.

References

External links 
 

Populated places in Kalbajar District
Populated places in Martakert Province